The price/cash flow ratio (also called price-to-cash flow ratio or P/CF), is a ratio used to compare a company's market value to its cash flow.  It is calculated by dividing the company's market cap by the company's operating cash flow in the most recent fiscal year (or the most recent four fiscal quarters); or, equivalently, divide the per-share stock price by the per-share operating cash flow.  In theory, the lower a stock's price/cash flow ratio is, the better value that stock is.

CFPS = (NI + Depreciation + Amortization)/ Common Shares Outstanding

References

Financial ratios